Kid Boots is a 1926 American silent feature comedy film directed by Frank Tuttle, and based on the 1923 musical written by William Anthony McGuire and Otto Harbach.  This was entertainer Eddie Cantor's first film. A print is preserved at the Library of Congress.

Plot
Kid Boots is a put-upon clerk in a men's tailor shop. When Malcolm Waite storms in to buy a new suit, the service he receive is so inept that he destroys the shop trying to throttle Boots.

Boots flees for  his life, stopping only to make Bow's acquaintance. Attempting to hide in a hotel, Boots becomes an accidental witness to the infidelity of a rich man's wife. The rich man, Tom Sterling, has a $100,000.00 settlement suit at stake. So he keeps Boots close to him as a character witness.

Boots and his new friend lay low at a posh golf resort and all is well until it is discovered Clara McCoy and the bullying Big Boyle also work there. Big Boyle eventually subjects Boots to a brutal massage and electroshock treatments. Boots escapes only when the bully laughs so hard he accidentally sits in his own electric chair.

Boots oversleeps the day of the important divorce hearing. The only way to reach the courthouse on time is on horseback. McCoy follows Boots, and the jealous Big Boyle follows her. This results in a hair-raising stunt chase where the characters take turn dangling from precipices and swaying on teeter-totters.

Boots ends up parachuting onto the courthouse roof,arriving just in time to deliver his vital testimony.

Cast

See also
A Few Moments With Eddie Cantor, Star of "Kid Boots" (1924) short film made in the sound-on-film Phonofilm process, with Cantor performing an excerpt of Kid Boots

References

External links

 

1926 films
American silent feature films
American black-and-white films
Films directed by Frank Tuttle
Famous Players-Lasky films
1926 romantic comedy films
American romantic comedy films
Films with screenplays by Tom Gibson
1920s English-language films
1920s American films
Silent romantic comedy films
Silent American comedy films